Leverkusen Chempark, till 2013 known as Bayerwerk is a railway station on the Cologne–Duisburg railway, situated on the border of Leverkusen and Cologne in the German state of North Rhine-Westphalia. It is named after the nearby Bayer chemical production plants. It is served by the S6 line of the Rhine-Ruhr S-Bahn at 20-minute intervals.

It is also served by the following bus routes: 151 and 152 (operated by Kölner Verkehrs-Betriebe), 201 (operated by Kraftverkehr Wupper-Sieg) and 255 (operated by Kraftverkehr Gebr. Wiedenhoff), all at 20-minute intervals.

See also  
 Dormagen Chempark station
 Krefeld-Hohenbudberg Chempark station

References 

Railway stations in Germany opened in 1991
S6 (Rhine-Ruhr S-Bahn)
Rhine-Ruhr S-Bahn stations